Danillo Souza Muniz (born 1 January 1993), known as Danillo Bala, is a Brazilian footballer who plays for Remo.

Career
In June 2016, Bala signed with Bulgarian side Montana; the duration of the contract remained undisclosed.  He was released on 22 November 2016 after featuring rarely for the team.

In December 2016, Bala joined Juazeirense, signing a 1-year contract.

References

External links
 
 

1993 births
Living people
Brazilian footballers
Lagarto Futebol Clube players
FC Montana players
FK Vardar players
Brazilian expatriate footballers
Brazilian expatriate sportspeople in Bulgaria
Expatriate footballers in Bulgaria
Brazilian expatriate sportspeople in North Macedonia
Expatriate footballers in North Macedonia
Association football forwards